The men's decathlon event at the 2018 African Championships in Athletics was held on 2 and 3 August in Asaba, Nigeria.

Medalists

Results

100 metres
Wind: -0.2 m/s

Long jump

Shot put

High jump

400 metres

110 metres hurdles
Wind: ? m/s

Discus throw

Pole vault

Javelin throw

1500 metres

Final standings

References

2018 African Championships in Athletics
Combined events at the African Championships in Athletics